Jackie Thrasher (born September 23, 1957) was a member of the Arizona house of representatives from 2007 to 2009. She was elected to the house in November 2006. In 2008, she ran for re-election, winning the Democrat primary, while losing in the general election to the fellow incumbent James Weiers and Doug Quelland. She attempted to regain her seat in 2010, winning the Democrat primary, but losing in the general election to Jim Weiers and Kimberly Yee. After redistricting, in 2012 she attempted to return to the house in District 20, winning the Democrat primary, but losing to Paul Boyer and Carl Seel.

References

Democratic Party members of the Arizona House of Representatives
1957 births
Living people